Gandhi Nagar Assembly constituency may refer to 

 Gandhi Nagar, Delhi Assembly constituency
 Gandhi Nagar, Karnataka Assembly constituency
 Gandhinagar North, Gujarat Assembly constituency
 Gandhinagar South, Gujarat Assembly constituency